Liza Wright served George W. Bush  as Assistant to President for Presidential Personnel and Director of Presidential Personnel. She was responsible for leading the team that recruits thousands of candidates for all senior-level positions within the Bush Administration.

Liza Wright previously served in the Bush administration as a Special Assistant to the President for Presidential Personnel.  Prior to joining the administration, Wright was a principal at Heidrick & Struggles, an executive search company.

She was previously an executive recruiter at Capital One Financial Corporation. Wright received her bachelor's degree from James Madison University.

References

DePauw University News: Presidential Aide Liza Wright Discusses White House Hiring and "Cronyism" at DePauw Discourse 2005. September 16, 2005, Greencastle, Indiana
Political Chicks: Liza Wright

James Madison University alumni
Living people
Year of birth missing (living people)